The Advance-Design is a light and medium duty truck series by Chevrolet, their first major redesign after WWII.  Its GMC counterpart was the GMC New Design. It was billed as a larger, stronger, and sleeker design in comparison to the earlier AK Series. First available on Saturday, June 28, 1947, these trucks were sold with various minor changes over the years until March 25, 1955, when the Task Force Series trucks replaced the Advance-Design model.

The same basic design family was used for all of its trucks including the Suburban, panel trucks, canopy express, and cab overs. The cab overs used the same basic cab configuration and similar grille but used a shorter and taller hood and different fenders. The unique cab over fenders and hood required a custom cowl area which makes the cab over engine cabs and normal truck cabs incompatible with one another while all truck cabs of all weights interchange. 

From 1947 until 1955, Chevrolet trucks were number one in sales in the United States, with rebranded versions sold at GMC locations.

While General Motors used this front end sheet metal, and to a slightly lesser extent the cab, on all of its trucks except for the cab overs, there are three main sizes of this truck: the half-, three-quarter-, and full-ton capacities in short and long wheelbase.

Differences 

1947 - Gasoline tank filler neck on passenger side of bed. No vent windows in doors. Hood side emblems read "Chevrolet" with "Thriftmaster" or "Loadmaster" underneath. Serial numbers: EP  ton, ER  ton, & ES 1 ton. Radios were first available in Chevrolet trucks as an "in dash" option on the "Advance-Design" body style.

1948 - Manual transmission shifter now mounted on column instead of floor. Serial numbers codes: FP  ton, FR  ton, & FS 1 ton.

Early 1949 - Gasoline tank now mounted upright behind seat in cab; filler neck aft of passenger door handle. New serial number codes: GP  ton, GR  ton, & GS 1 ton.

Late 1949 - Hood side emblems no longer read "Thriftmaster" or "Loadmaster", but are now numbers that designate cargo capacity: 3100 on  ton, 3600 on  ton, 3800 on 1 ton. Serial number codes remain the same as on early 1949.

1950 - Telescopic shock absorbers replace lever-action type. Last year for driver's side cowl vent, its handle is now flat steel, not maroon knob as in previous years.  New serial number codes: HP  ton, HR  ton, & HS 1 ton.

1951 - Doors now have vent windows. Mid-year change from 9-board bed to 8 boards per bed. Last year for 80 MPH speedometer, chrome window handle knobs, and chrome wiper knob. New serial number codes: JP  ton, JR  ton, & JS 1 ton.

1952 - Outer door handles are now push button type as opposed to the previous turn down style. Speedometer now reads to 90 mph and dashboard trim is painted instead of chrome. Mid-year, Chevrolet stops using the 3100-6400 designation on the hood and changes to maroon window and wiper knobs. New serial number codes: KP  ton, KR  ton, & KS 1 ton.

1953 - Last year for the 216 in3 inline-six. Hood side emblems now only read 3100, 3600, 3800, 4400, or 6400 in large print. Door post ID plate now blue with silver letters (previous models used black with silver letters). Last year to use wooden blocks as bed supports. New serial number codes: H  ton, J  ton, & L 1 ton.

1954 - Only year for significant design changes. Windshield now curved one-piece glass without center vertical dividing strip. Revised steering wheel. Revised dashboard. Cargo bed rails, previously angled, now horizontal. Tail lights round instead of rectangular. Grille changed from five horizontal slats to crossbar design commonly referred to as a "bull nose" grille, similar to modern Dodge truck grille. Engine now 235 in3 straight-6. Serial number codes unchanged from 1953. Hydramatic automatic transmission is available for the first time as a paid for option.

1955 First Series - Similar to the 1954 model year, except redesigned hood-side emblems and modern open driveshaft in place of enclosed torque tube. Serial number codes unchanged from 1953 and 1954.

GMC HC-Series 

The GMC HC-Series is a medium/heavy-duty version of the Chevrolet Advance Design truck. The truck was mostly used as a semi-truck although smaller versions were also made and were available. The truck had a narrower hood and fenders compared to its lighter counterparts.

Air brakes were a feature included in this truck. The truck could carry  GVW or   GCW depending on the version of the truck. A cab-over version based on the HC-Series was also produced, under the HF-Series name, although it was popularly nicknamed the Cannonball, after a TV series featuring it. It continued until 1958, when it was replaced by the GMC F/D "Crackerbox".

Styling legacy 
With the truck proving to be very popular in the United States, the same "Advanced-Design" styling was used on other trucks, made overseas by General Motors's divisions such as Opel and Vauxhall. The re-designed 1952 Opel Blitz was similar in appearance while Bedford Vehicles imported a Chevrolet Advance Design truck to study its design and use it as the basis for their upcoming Bedford A-Type truck.

During the retro-craze of the 2000s, the style of the Advance Design was used for the Chevrolet SSR and later for the Chevrolet HHR crossover SUV which lasted in production until 2012; finally ending the legacy of the Chevrolet Advance Design trucks.

References

External links 

 

Pickup trucks
Advance Design
1940s cars
Rear-wheel-drive vehicles
1950s cars
Motor vehicles manufactured in the United States
Vans
Panel trucks